Elections to Barrow-in-Furness Borough Council was held on 1 May 2008.  The whole of the council was up for election, with the number of councillors falling from 38 to 36, as a result of ward boundary changes enacted in February 2008. Councillors were elected for terms ranging between two and four years; where more than one councillor was elected in a ward, the councillor with the highest number of votes was granted the longer term.

The election results were both tight and dramatic, with well-known local councillors failing to be re-elected and recounts in certain wards delaying the announcement of votes. No party gained control of the council, and local news sources claimed that the biggest winners from the election were the local People's Party, who quadrupled their number of councillors, and independent candidates campaigning against plans to open an Academy school in the town. Mirroring the results in other local elections across England and Wales held on the same day, the Conservative Party ended as the largest group on the council with the Labour Party's representation dropping heavily.

Pre-Election Council
Following the 2007 election and the defection of two Conservative Party councillors to the Liberal Democrats in October 2007, the composition of the council entering the election was:

Election result

The breakdown of councillor terms as a result of the election is shown below. The seats of the ten councillors with two year terms were contested in the 2010 council election.

Ward results

References

External links
 Initial Results List, Barrow-in-Furness Borough Council
 Barrow-in-Furness Borough Council Homepage

2008 English local elections
2008
2000s in Cumbria